Spitalo Fatalo was the third album to be released by Austrian band Erste Allgemeine Verunsicherung.  It was released in 1983 in Germany and reissued a few times for a few other countries and formats.

Originally released on vinyl in Germany in 1983, catalogue number EMI Electrola 1333121
Reissued on vinyl in Germany in 1991, catalogue number EMI Electrola 1333121, weisses Label
Reissued on CD in Germany 1988 DE, catalogue number EMI Electrola 7900712
Issued in The Netherlands on CD in 1991, catalogue number EMI Electrola 7900712
Issued on cassette in Austria in 1991, catalogue number EMI Electrola 7900714

The track entitled "Tanz Tanz Tanz" does not relate to the song which features on James Last's album "Sing Mit James Last 7"

Track listing

 Hallo Hallo
 Tanz Tanz Tanz
 Sofa
 Balkan-Boogie
 I hob des G'fühl
 Afrika - Ist der Massa gut bei Kassa
 Stolzer Falke
 Alpenrap
 Es wird Heller
 Total verunsichert
 Spitalo Finalo

Personnel
EAV
Thomas Spitzer: guitars, vocals
Eik Breit: bass, backing vocals, lead vocals on "Es wird Heller"
Nino Holm: keyboards, bass, backing vocals
Anders Stenmo: drums, backing vocals
Klaus Eberhartinger: lead vocals on "Tanz Tanz Tanz", "Balkan-Boogie", "Afrika - Ist der Massa gut bei Kassa" and "Alpenrap"
Mario Bottazzi: piano, lead vocals on "Hallo Hallo", "Sofa", "Stolzer Falke" and "Spitalo Finalo"
Günther Schönberger: saxophone, backing vocals

Additional personnel
Gert Steinbäcker: lead vocals on "Total verunsichert"
Günter Timischl: lead vocals on "I hob des G'fühl"
Wilfried Scheutz: handclaps
Andi Beit: keyboards
Erich Buchebner: bass
Hossein Rastegar: drums
Siegfried Ritter: drums
Peter Szammer: drums
Boris Bukowski: snare drum
Gottfried Neumeister: trumpet
Franz Tieber: tuba
Martin Tieber: trombone
Günter Meinhart: marimba
Gottfried Jesernik: backing vocals

Singles

Total verunsichert was released in 1982 in Austria only and only on 7 inch.  Tanz Tanz Tanz appeared on the B side.  Catalogue number UN-Platte 45002.
Alpen Rap was released on 7 inch only in Austria, however a 7-inch and a 12-inch were released in Germany.  The Austrian 7 inch was on catalogue number EMI Columbia 12C 006 33310.  The German 7 inch was on catalogue number EMI Electrola 1333107 and the German 12 inch was released on catalogue number EMI Electrola 1333106.  All three issues were in 1983.  All three issues featured I hob des G'fühlas the B side, however the German 12 inch featured Alpen-Rap (Mega-Alm-Mix) instead of the original Alpen-Rap track.
A slight variation of Alpen Rap was released on 7 inch in Germany only in 1983 and it was called Alp-Rapp.  It was released on catalogue number EMI 1333227 and featured Tanz Tanz Tanz on the B side.
Afrika - Ist der Massa gut bei Kassa was issued as a 7 inch in Germany only on catalogue number EMI Columbia 1333137.  It featured Stolzer Falke on the B side.

External links
Official Homepage of Erste Allgemeinen Verunsicherung and the EAV-Fanclub
EAV-Fanpage about the early years of the band
 Unofficial fan site
 

Erste Allgemeine Verunsicherung albums
1983 albums
German-language albums